Elleston Wakeland Stadium is a multi-use stadium in Falmouth, Jamaica.  It is currently used mostly for football matches. It serves as a home ground of Village United F.C. & Falmouth united. The stadium holds 3,000 people.

External links
Aerial view
Photos:

Football venues in Jamaica
Buildings and structures in Trelawny Parish